The 1921 Indiana Hoosiers football team represented the Indiana Hoosiers in the 1921 Big Ten Conference football season. The Hoosiers played their home games at Jordan Field in Bloomington, Indiana. The team was coached by Ewald O. Stiehm, in his sixth and final year as head coach.

Schedule

References

Indiana
Indiana Hoosiers football seasons
Indiana Hoosiers football